The 1957 Paris–Roubaix was the 55th edition of the Paris–Roubaix, a classic one-day cycle race in France. The single day event was held on 7 April 1957 and stretched  from Paris to the finish at Roubaix Velodrome. The winner was Alfred De Bruyne from Belgium.

Results

References

1957
1957 in road cycling
1957 in French sport
1957 Challenge Desgrange-Colombo
April 1957 sports events in Europe